Brookings Airport  is a  public-use airport located one nautical mile (2 km) northeast of the central business district of Brookings, a city in Curry County, Oregon, United States. It is included in the National Plan of Integrated Airport Systems for 2011–2015, which categorized it as a general aviation facility. The airport is owned by the City of Brookings. It was formerly owned by the State of Oregon, followed by Curry County, before it was acquired by the city.

Facilities and aircraft 
Brookings Airport covers an area of 90 acres (36 ha) at an elevation of 459 feet (140 m) above mean sea level. It has one runway designated 12/30 with an asphalt surface measuring 2,900 by 60 feet (884 x 18 m).

For the 12-month period ending June 6, 2011, the airport had 22,600 aircraft operations, an average of 61 per day: 94% general aviation, 6% air taxi, and <1% military. At that time there were 35 aircraft based at this airport: 71% single-engine, 26% multi-engine, and 3% helicopter.

Brookings Airport has self-service fuel, hangars, a tie-down ramp, and a pilot lounge.

Cargo Carriers

References

External links 
 Aerial image as of May 1994 from USGS The National Map

Airports in Curry County, Oregon
Brookings, Oregon
Curry County, Oregon